Johann Eberhard Ihle (5 June 1727, in Esslingen – 17 January 1814, in Nuremberg) was a German painter.

He was the son of portraitist Johann Jakob Ihle (1702–1774), from whom he first learned painting. In 1749 he settled in Nuremberg, where in 1751 he became a member of the Nürnberger Malerakademie. From 1771 to 1811 he served as director of the Academy.

His painting style ranged from Rococo to Classicism. He is considered one of the more significant Nuremberg portrait painters of the second half of the 18th century.

References 

1727 births
1814 deaths
People from Esslingen am Neckar
18th-century German painters
18th-century German male artists
19th-century German painters
19th-century German male artists